Thorpe Park Leeds or simply Thorpe Park is a business park located near Brown Moor, Leeds, West Yorkshire, England. Companies that are headquartered in Thorpe Park include Northern Gas Networks, Boost Drinks and Pharmacy2U. The Thorpe Park railway station is anticipated to open in the area in 2024. The overall development of the business park is expected to be complete by 2035.

History
In 2000, Scarborough Group International (SGI) began development on the business park. The chairman of SGI Kevin McCabe said that they wanted to  create the "largest and best out of town, mixed-use development that Yorkshire has ever seen".

Phase two development at Thorpe Park Leeds was enabled following an investment deal with Legal & General Capital in 2015.

The Springs shopping centre was opened in October 2018. In May 2021, a life-size statue of Captain Tom Moore was unveiled at the park before being positioned at Tom Moore's birthplace in Keighley. In August 2021, SGI began development on a £52 million office building which has been pre-let to credit management company, Lowell.

References

External links
 

Business parks of England
Economy of Leeds
Parks and commons in Leeds
Thorpe Park Leeds